The 1928 International cricket season was from April 1928 to August 1928.

Season overview

May

Wales in England

June

Test Trial in England

West Indies in England

July

Ireland in Scotland

MCC in Netherlands

August

MCC in Ireland

Foresters in Netherlands

References

1928 in cricket